Novatus Dismas Miroshi (born on 2 September 2002) is a Tanzanian professional football player who plays for Belgian side Zulte Waregem and the Tanzanian national team.

Club career
In the summer of 2022, Dismas signed a three-year contract with Zulte Waregem in Belgium.

International career
Dismas made his international debut with the Tanzania under-20 team on 16 February 2021 in a 4–0 defeat to Ghana at the 2021 Africa U-20 Cup of Nations. On 19 February, he scored his first goal for Tanzania against the Gambia in a 1–1 draw.

On 2 September 2021, Dismas made his senior debut in a 1–1 draw against DR Congo in 2022 FIFA World Cup qualifying. On 7 September, he scored his first senior goal in a 3–2 victory against Madagascar.

References

2002 births
Living people
Tanzanian footballers
Tanzania international footballers
Maccabi Tel Aviv F.C. players
Beitar Tel Aviv Bat Yam F.C. players
S.V. Zulte Waregem players
Liga Leumit players
Belgian Pro League players
Tanzanian expatriate footballers
Expatriate footballers in Israel
Expatriate footballers in Belgium
Tanzanian expatriate sportspeople in Israel
Tanzanian expatriate sportspeople in Belgium
Association football midfielders